Coffea racemosa, also known as racemosa coffee and Inhambane coffee, is a species of flowering plant in the family Rubiaceae. It has naturally low levels of caffeine, less than half of that found in Coffea arabica, and a quarter of that in Robusta coffee. It was widely cultivated by the Portuguese during the 1960-1970s in Mozambique, currently there are only two plantations at Ibo Island and in Hluhluwe, which remain.

It has white to pinkish singular flowers ( in diameter) or in few-flowered clusters along the branches, which bloom between September and February. The fruit is near-spherical in shape and purple to black when ripe. The fruit is harvested from the wild for local use as a coffee. The beans are one third of the size of Arabica beans. The beans are roasted and ground to a powder then used to make coffee. Salt is sometimes sprinkled over them as they are roasted.

References

External links

World Checklist of Rubiaceae

Plants described in 1790
racemosa
Flora of KwaZulu-Natal
Endemic flora of South Africa
Endemic flora of Zimbabwe